Koberovice is a municipality and village in Pelhřimov District in the Vysočina Region of the Czech Republic. It has about 200 inhabitants.

Administrative parts
The village of Lísky and the hamlet of Lohenice are administrative parts of Koberovice.

References

Villages in Pelhřimov District